is a Japanese tarento and former football player. She played for the Japanese national team. Since her retirement, Maruyama has been active as a television personality, represented by the talent agency Horipro.

Club career
Maruyama was born in Ota, Tokyo on 26 March 1983.

After graduating from Nippon Sport Science University, she joined TEPCO Mareeze in 2005 and was assigned to the section of Fukushima Daiichi Nuclear Power Plant.

Maruyama was selected as the L. League's Best Young Player for the 2005 season. She played in the L. League until the 2009 season. She left the league in 2010 to play for the Philadelphia Independence in the United States. In September, she returned to Japan and joined JEF United Chiba. In 2012, she moved to Speranza FC Osaka-Takatsuki (later Konomiya Speranza Osaka-Takatsuki). She retired at the end of the 2016 season.

National team career
In August 2002, Maruyama was selected to the Japan U-20 national team to play in the 2002 U-19 World Championship. In October, she was selected Japan national team for 2002 Asian Games. At this competition, on 2 October, she debuted against North Korea. She played in the World Cup 2 times (2003 and 2011) and the Summer Olympics 3 times (2004, 2008 and 2012). At the 2011 World Cup in Germany, she scored the only goal of the game, defeating the host country and taking Japan to its first ever semifinals of the tournament. She played as a substitute in the final as Japan defeated the United States. At the 2012 Summer Olympics, Japan won the silver medal. She played 79 games and scored 14 goals for Japan until retiring in 2014.

National team statistics

National team goals

Honors
FIFA Women's World Cup
Champion (1): 2011
East Asian Football Championship
Champion (1): 2008

References

External links

Official Profile at Horipro

1983 births
Living people
Nippon Sport Science University alumni
Association football people from Tokyo
Japanese women's footballers
Japan women's international footballers
Nadeshiko League players
Women's Professional Soccer players
TEPCO Mareeze players
Philadelphia Independence players
JEF United Chiba Ladies players
Speranza Osaka-Takatsuki players
Japanese expatriate footballers
Japanese expatriate sportspeople in the United States
Asian Games medalists in football
Footballers at the 2002 Asian Games
Footballers at the 2006 Asian Games
FIFA Women's World Cup-winning players
2003 FIFA Women's World Cup players
2011 FIFA Women's World Cup players
Olympic footballers of Japan
Olympic medalists in football
Olympic silver medalists for Japan
Footballers at the 2004 Summer Olympics
Footballers at the 2008 Summer Olympics
Footballers at the 2012 Summer Olympics
Medalists at the 2012 Summer Olympics
Women's association football forwards
Asian Games silver medalists for Japan
Asian Games bronze medalists for Japan
Medalists at the 2002 Asian Games
Medalists at the 2006 Asian Games
Japanese television personalities